Notre Dame Senior High School is a Catholic high school in Calgary, Alberta, Canada with more than 1,700 students. The school is under the administration of the Calgary Catholic School District.

History

Notre Dame was opened on September 12, 2005 with Grade 10 and Grade 11 students.

Announced on May 10, 2011; Notre Dame High School would be undergoing a $7.6 million "modernization project". As of September 2015, the expansion has been completed.

Faith
Notre Dame is a part of Catholic Community of Caring, funded by Alberta Initiative for School Improvement (AISI). The Community of Caring started 1986 by Eunice Kennedy Shriver. The process is to help students increase their involvement in school, productive work in community service, and planning for their future.

Academics
Notre Dame is ranked by the Fraser Institute, and in 2017/18, it was 67th out of 262 Alberta high schools. 

Notre Dame offers many special programs such as:
 Advanced Placement 
 Automotive
 Business Management
 Computer Science
 Construction
 Cosmetology
 Culinary 
 Design Studies
 Fashion
 Film Studies
 International Languages (French, Spanish & Italian)
 Music
 New Media
 Photography
 Pre-Engineering
 Sports Medicine
 Welding

Further, the school is part of the Action for Bright Children Society.

Athletics
Notre Dame's team name is the Pride and the athletic symbol is a lion; hence pride. The Pride have won many athletic titles in the school's short history, such as city championships for the Senior Girls Volleyball team, Senior Boys Basketball, and provincial championships for the Senior Boys Football team.

The school competes in the following sports: 
Badminton
Basketball
Cross-country
Field hockey
Football
Rugby
Soccer
Swimming and Diving
Track & Field
Volleyball

Notre Dame is an associated member of Calgary Senior High School Athletics Association (CSHSAA).

Fine arts
Notre Dame provides students with a variety of performing & non-performing arts. 
The school provides the following productions in:
Drama
Musical Theatre
Concert Band - Grade 10
Symphonic Band - Grade 11 & 12
Concert Choir
Speech & Debate
Visual Arts

References

External links

 
 Staff list
  Catholic Secondary School District

High schools in Calgary
Catholic secondary schools in Alberta
Educational institutions established in 2005
2005 establishments in Alberta